Sir Henry St John Carew St John-Mildmay, 4th Baronet (15 April 1787 – 17 January 1848), of Dogmersfield Park, Hampshire, was an English politician.

He was the son of Sir Henry St John-Mildmay, 3rd Baronet of Dogmersfield Park and educated at Winchester School (1798-1802) and Christ Church, Oxford (1805).

He was a Member of Parliament (MP) for Winchester 1807–1818 and Mayor of Winchester for 1808.

He succeeded his father in the baronetcy on 11 Nov. 1808. He married twice; firstly, in 1809, Charlotte, the daughter of Hon. Bartholomew Bouverie, with whom he had one son. In 1815, five years after Charlotte's untimely death from giving birth to their son, he eloped with her sister Harriet (wife of Archibald Primrose, 4th Earl of Rosebery) in Stuttgart, Württemberg. Together they had three sons. Sadly, Harriet eventually left him and, plagued by financial problems, he shot himself on 17 January 1848.

Issue 

With Charlotte:
Sir Henry Bouverie Paulet (31 Jul 1810-16 Jul 1902)

With Harriet:
Edmund Henry (1815-8 Oct 1905); his first marriage was to Louisa Josephine Saunders (d. 27 Jan 1865), ex-wife of Sir Henry de Hoghton, 9th Baronet. They had one daughter, Evelyn Augusta.  Two years after louisa's death he married his cousin, Augusta Jane, daughter of the Ven. Carew Antony St John-Mildmay. They had three children.
Horace Osborne (1817-5 May 1866); served as an officer in the Austrian 5th Hussars. He married Jane Dombach in 1844. They had four sons, including Edward (29 Sep 1845-18 Jul 1917), vice-consul for the Austrian Empire at Milan.
Augustus Fitzwalter (d. 8 Mar 1839); was an officer in the 7th Austrian Hussars. Unmarried.

References

1787 births
1848 deaths
Baronets in the Baronetage of Great Britain
People from Hart District
People educated at Winchester College
Members of the Parliament of the United Kingdom for English constituencies
UK MPs 1807–1812
UK MPs 1812–1818
Mayors of Winchester
British politicians who committed suicide